Namibe Province is a province of Angola. Under Portuguese rule it was the Moçâmedes District. It has an area of 57,091 km2 and had a 2014 census population of 495,326. The port and city of Moçâmedes is the capital of the province with a population of 250,000 in 2014. Iona National Park lies within the province.

History
From its foundation by the Portuguese in 1840 and until 1985, the area was known as Moçâmedes (also spelled "Mossâmedes"). The current name of the province is derived from the Namib Desert, lying predominantly in Namibia; the northernmost part, however, extended into the province of Namibe.
Extensive flooding in the province occurred on April 5, 2001, with the Bero and Giraul River severely affecting roads and people in Namibe, Huila and Benguela provinces. A reported 20 people in Namibe Province lost their lives during the flood.

Geography and wildlife

Namibe Province covers an area of 57,091 km2, much of which is desert. The capital of the province is the city of Moçâmedes, with the second city being Tômbua or Tómbwa (formerly Porto Alexandre). In the Namib Desert can be seen the rare Welwitschia mirabilis, "a strange plant with a giant root", and also the Iona National Park. Lake Arco, a fresh-water oasis, is a stunning sight in the middle of the desert. Near the coast of the Bentiaba desert and in Iona National Park, Late Cretaceous fossils of sharks, turtles, mosasaurs, plesiosaurs and sauropods have been discovered.

Municipalities 
The province of Namibe consists of five municipalities:

 Bibala
 Camacuio
 Moçâmedes (Namibe until 2016)
 Tômbua
 Virei

Communes
The province of Namibe contains the following communes; sorted by their respective municipalities:

 Bibala Municipality: – Bibala, Caitou, Capangombe (Kapagombe), Lola
 Camacuio Municipality: – Camacuio, Chingo, Mamué
 Moçâmedes Municipality: – Bentiaba, Lucira, Moçâmedes (Namibe) (which is subdivided into 4 zones)
 Tômbua Municipality: – Iona (Yona), São Martinho dos Tigres, Tômbua
 Virei Municipality: – Cainde, Virei

Demographics
Namibe Province had a population of 495,326 according to the 2014 census. The desert is sparsely inhabited, but is inhabited by Herero groups (vaKuval, Ova-Himba) and small Khoisan groups (Kwisi, Kwepe).

Economy

Agriculture is the main source of income in Namibe Province, the principal crops being citrus fruits, olives, guava, millet, and livestock, including the rearing of sheep and goats. Fishing is another means of livelihood for the people of Namibe Province, Tômbua being the main market.
The province has significant reserves of gold, copper, manganese, chromium, tin, lignite and marble. The Yuri Gagarin Airport and the Commercial Port of Moçâmedes, are the two main centres for transport for the import and export of products.

List of governors of Namibe

Pre-independence period

 1849–1851 António Sérgio de Sousa
 1851–1852 José Herculano Ferreira da Horta
 1852–1854 Carlos Botelho de Vasconcelos
 1854–1854 António do Canto e Castro
 1854–1859 Fernando da Costa Leal
 1859–1861 António Joaquim de Castro
 1861–1863 João Jacinto Tavares
 1863–1866 Fernando da Costa Leal
 1866–1866 Alexandre de Sousa Alvim Pereira
 1866–1870 Joaquim José da Graça
 1870–1871 Estanislau de Assunção e Almeida
 1871–1876 Lúcio Albino Pereira Crespo
 1876–1876 Francisco Teixeira da Silva
 1876–1876 José Joaquim Teixeira Beltrão
 1877–1878 Francisco Augusto da Costa Cabral
 1878–1878 Sebastião Nunes da Mata
 1878–1879 Francisco Ferreira do Amaral
 1879–1880 Sebastião Nunes da Mata
 1880–1880 José Bento Ferreira de Almeida
 1880–1886 Sebastião Nunes da Mata
 1886–1889 Álvaro António da Costa Ferreira
 1889–1889 Ventura Duarte Barros da Fonseca
 1889–1892 Luís Bernardino Leitão Xavier
 1892–1893 Martinho de Queirós Montenegro
 1893–1895 Júlio José Marques da Costa
 1895–1896 João de Canto e Castro Antunes
 1896–1897 João Manuel Mendonça e Gaivão
 1897–1897 João Manuel Pereira da Silva
 1897–1899 Francisco Diogo de Sá
 1899–1902 José Maria d'Aguiar
 1902–1902 Sebastião Corrêa de Oliveira
 1902–1903 João Augusto Vieira da Fonseca
 1903–1904 Viriato Zeferino Passaláqua
 1904–1905 José Alfredo Ferreira Margarido
 1905–1907 José Rafael da Cunha
 1907–1908 António Maria da Silva
 1908–1910 Alberto Carolino Ferreira da Costa
 1910–1910 António Brandão de Mello Mimoso
 1910–1912 Caetano Carvalhal Corrêa Henriques
 1912–1914 Henrique Monteiro Corrêa da Silva
 1914 Jose Monteiro de Macedo
 1914–1916 Alfredo de Albuquerque Felner
 1916–1918 José Inácio da Silva
 1918–1919 António Dias
 1919–1922 José Manuel da Costa
 1922–1924 Alberto Nunes Freire Quaresma
 1924–1926 Artur Silva
 1926–1928 António Augusto de Sequeira Braga
 1928–1929 Francisco Martins de Oliveira Santos;
 1929 Alcino José Pereira de Vasconcelos
 1929–1930 António Augusto de Sequeira Braga
 1930–1930 José Maria de Seita Machado
 1930–1935 José Pereira Sabrosa
 1956–1960 Vasco Falcão Nunes da Ponte
 1960–1969 José Luís Henriques de Brito
 1969–1970 [Rogério de Abreu Amoreira Martins]
 1970–1971 Agostinho Gomes Pereira
 1971–1975 Amândio José Rogado

Post-independence period

References

External links

 Official website of province governor
 Information on this province at the Angolan ministry for territorial administration
 Information on this province at Info Angola
 Province geographical info at geoview.info

 
Provinces of Angola
1840 establishments in the Portuguese Empire